Consuming Passions was a cooking show broadcast on ABC from 1992 to 2001.

The show was hosted by chef Ian Parmenter. The show was then sold to many countries including United Kingdom, Singapore and Ireland. Ian Parmenter won the Presenter's Award at the Festival de la TÈlÈ Gourmande in France. In 1996 Consuming Passions was awarded the Lucien Barriere Grand Prix, considered to be the major prize at the Festival de la TÈlÈ Gourmande.

1992 Australian television series debuts
2001 Australian television series endings
Australian Broadcasting Corporation original programming
Australian cooking television series